Karen Margrete Andersen (23 January 1917 – 30 June 1971) was a Danish diver. She competed in the women's 10 metre platform event at the 1936 Summer Olympics.

References

1917 births
1971 deaths
Danish female divers
Olympic divers of Denmark
Divers at the 1936 Summer Olympics